Pulkit Samrat (born 29 December 1983) is an Indian actor who primarily works in Hindi films along with Hindi television. Samrat made his acting debut with Kyunki Saas Bhi Kabhi Bahu Thi (2006) and made his film debut with Bittoo Boss (2012). He is a recipient of an Indian Telly Award.

Samrat had his first commercial success with Fukrey (2013). His highest grossing release came with Jai Ho (2014). This success was followed with a string of failures including Dolly Ki Doli (2015) and Sanam Re (2016), causing a setback. He later received praises for starring in Fukrey Returns (2017), 3 Storeys (2018) and Taish (2020).

In addition to his acting career, Samrat is a prominent celebrity endorser for brands and products.

Early life 
Samrat was born on 29 December 1983 and brought up in a Punjabi Hindu family in Delhi, where his family has its real estate business. He studied at Manav Sthali School, and completed his schooling from Montfort Senior Secondary School, Ashok Vihar, Delhi.

He joined an advertising course at Apeejay Institute of Design, Delhi. However, after studying for five months, he received a modelling assignment. Thereafter, he quit his education and shifted to Mumbai, where he joined an acting course run by Kishore Namit Kapoor.

Career

Television career (2006-2008) 
Samrat moved to Mumbai in 2005, and made his acting debut in 2006 with the long-running television show by Balaji Telefilms, Kyunki Saas Bhi Kabhi Bahu Thi. He portrayed Laksh Virani opposite Mouni Roy and Tia Bajpai. This got him his first recognition, and he won Indian Telly Award for Fresh New Face - Male for his performance. Samrat quit the show in 2007.

In 2008, he appeared as a Contestant on Kaho Na Yaar Hai with Roy, marking his final television appearance. In 2011, Samrat appeared as the lead in choreographer Vaibhavi Merchant's musical theatrical Taj Express.

Film breakthrough and setback (2012–2016) 

Samrat made his film debut with romantic comedy Bitto Boss in 2012. He played the role of a wedding videographer from Punjab, alongside Amita Pathak. Times of India noted, "With a character sketch, screen-name and styling so reminiscent of Ranveer Singh, debutant Pulkit Samrat has little scope to create his own identity. However, he pulls off the small-town-munda act with sincerity, and a natural ease." He next played the lead role of Hunny in the ensemble comedy film Fukrey, opposite Priya Anand. The film emerged as a Sleeper hit. Anupama Chopra wrote, "The characters and actors are a perfect match. Pulkit embodies the over-confident charmer Hunny."

In 2014, he had two releases. He first appeared in Jai Ho in the role of a Police Inspector. It became his highest grossing release and collected 195.04 crore. He next played the lead in O Teri, opposite Sarah Jane Dias. It met with negative reviews but Bollywood Hungama mentioned, "Pulkit Samrat is pitch-perfect in his part. He seems to be getting better with every film."

In his first release of 2015, Samrat portrayed Inspector Robin Singh in Dolly Ki Doli opposite Sonam Kapoor. Firstpost said, "Samrat's face is pretty enough, but has no expression and he does a godawful Haryanvi accent that's all the more jarring because Rao's is pitch perfect." He next appeared Bangistan with Riteish Deshmukh. It received negative reviews. Samrat had two releases in 2016 too, both opposite Yami Gautam. He first appeared in Sanam Re, and next appeared in Junooniyat. Both these films received negative reviews and were box-office failures.

Recent work and expansion (2017-present) 

Samrat's career marked a turning point in 2017 when he starred in the second installment of Fukrey titled Fukrey Returns. The film was a box office success. News 18 mentioned that Samrat portrays the "same old confident Hunny" well. In 2018, Samrat first played Veer Arora in the romantic comedy Veerey Ki Wedding opposite Kriti Kharbanda. Hindustan Times wrote, "Pulkit Samrat as always, portrays himself as an extension of Salman Khan. He appears comfortable displaying his brawn and swag but emotes poorly, making no impact at all." Later that year, he played Vilas Naik in the independent drama film 3 Storeys. Times of India mentions that Samrat is "competent" in his role,  

His only release in 2019 was Anees Bazmee's Pagalpanti, alongside Kharbanda. Bollywood Hungama mentions, "Pulkit Samrat tries his best but doesn’t succeed in giving the performance that his character demanded." In 2020, he starred as Sunny Lalwani in the thriller drama film Taish directed by Bejoy Nambiar, which was released on ZEE5 on 29 October 2020. Times of India mentions, "Pulkit Samrat’s put in some serious efforts to render justice to Sunny’s trauma-fuelled anger; he is good when he’s mad and unconvincing when he’s happy, and that’s a problem." Scroll says, "Pulkit Samrat and Harshvardhan Rane swagger about and clench fists and jawlines."

Samrat had only one release in 2021, the trilingual film Kaadan. He portrayed Shankar, a mahout in theHindi version. The Hindi version received negative reviews.

Samrat will next appear in the third installment of Fukrey titled Fukrey 3. He will also appear in Suswagatam Khushamadeed opposite Isabelle Kaif.

Personal life 
Samrat married his girlfriend Shweta Rohira on 3 November 2014. Rohira is a "rakhi-sister" to actor Salman Khan. Khan was also involved in the promotion of Pulkit Samrat's debut film. The couple separated in November 2015.

Samrat then dated actress Yami Gautam, but the couple eventually broke up. As of 2019, Samrat is dating Kriti Kharbanda, his co-star in Veerey Ki Wedding, Pagalpanti and Taish.

Media image 

Apart from acting, Samrat is an endorser for several brands and products including Coca Cola and Bella Vita Organic. He is the brand ambassador of Pebble watches alongside Kriti Kharbanda. Samrat became the first Bollywood actor to bag an ad in Pakistan.

Samrat is subsequently featured in the Times of India's Most Desirable Men List. He ranked 48th in 2019 and 23rd in 2020.

Filmography

Films

Television

Awards and nominations

References

External links 
 
 

1985 births
Living people
Male actors in Hindi cinema
People from Delhi
Punjabi people
Indian male models
Indian male television actors
Indian male soap opera actors
Indian male film actors